Jovenal Mapalo Francisco Jr. (born June 11, 1969) is a Filipino broadcast journalist in the Philippines.

Career
Among 17 other journalists from different international media organizations including CNN, Jove Francisco is the only Filipino reporter to be accepted as a fellow in the Journalist to Journalist (J2J) program of the AIDS Vaccine 2011 Journalist Training Program Fellows by the Washington-based National Press Foundation held recently in Bangkok.

He has been covering health, social media and political beats for 15 years already—spanning four administrations from Ramos to Aquino. He currently co-anchors TV5's late night newscast Pilipinas News and AksyonTV's Balitang 60. Francisco also co-hosts Radyo Singko's Reaksyon.

His name was mentioned by then-Rep. Gilbert Remulla during the congressional investigation on the "Hello Garci" controversy.

On October 10, 2015, according to Media Newser Philippines' report, Jove has transferred to ABS-CBN.

On April 25, 2018, according to Media Newser Philippines' report, Francisco is joining to a soon-to-be launched English news channel, One News.

Filmography

Television

Radio

References

External links 
 Jove Francisco
 Jove Francisco (News5) - Profile at Interaksyon.com

1961 births
Living people
Filipino television journalists
Filipino radio journalists
TV5 (Philippine TV network) personalities
News5 people
ABS-CBN personalities
ABS-CBN News and Current Affairs people